The Church of All Saints is a Church of England parish church in Little Shelford, Cambridgeshire. The church is a Grade II* listed building, and dates from the 12th century.

History

The village church stands by the crossroads with thirteen fine lime trees and an ancient market cross. It dates from pre-Norman times and is one of the oldest in the region. There are stones carved with Saxon plaitwork below a tiny Norman window, a carved coffin stone which may be Saxon in the porch, and in the chapel are four more stones which are probably Norman, like the queer animal with human arms propping up the 13th-century chancel arch. The chancel is 14th century. The small sacristy is entered by an ancient door in a rich arch is 15th century, and has holes of three piscinas in a windowsill. The arcaded oak pulpit is Jacobean. The font, like the tiny church spire, is 600 years old.

The stalls have on them the Arms of the de Freville family, Lords of the Manor here, whose 15th-century chapel (up three stairs) has some fine stone ornament on its piscina and on a canopy over the figure of a saint, with fragments of old glass in its windows. Some of the de Frevilles who died before their chapel was built appear in the chancel in stone and brass. Sir John de Freville, an alabaster tomb effigy with an inscription in Norman French, is here from the beginning of the 14th century, and from the end of it, in brass, are Robert de Freville and Claricia, with a greyhound and two dogs at their feet as they clasp hands, their son Thomas de Freville holding his wife's hand near them in a monumental brass of 1405.

A 15th-century rector, John Cate, has another fine brass portrait.

Present day
On 31 August 1962, the church was designated a Grade II* listed building.

In 1996, the church was planted from St Andrew the Great, Cambridge.

All Saints is within the Conservative Evangelical tradition of the Church of England, and it has passed resolutions to reject the ordination of women.

Rectors

References

External links
 Church website
 A Church Near You entry

Church of England church buildings in Cambridgeshire
12th-century church buildings in England
Conservative evangelical Anglican churches in England
Grade II* listed churches in Cambridgeshire